Trypetolimnia rossica is a species of fly in the family Sciomyzidae and the only known species in the genus Trypetolimnia.

References

Sciomyzidae
Insects described in 1953